The George H. Carroll Lion Habitat is a , climate-controlled facility located on the campus the University of North Alabama that houses the only live lion mascot in the United States, Leo III.  The lion habitat, which was dedicated on October 7, 2007, bears the name of the late owner of the construction firm Pressure Concrete, which built the facility and donated labor, materials and funds. No federal or state dollars or tuition fees were used in construction of the habitat.

The habitat cost $1.3 million.  Feeding and caring for the lions cost $35,000 annually.  All costs of maintaining the animals are covered by charitable contributions.

Certified Alarm Company of Alabama provided a sophisticated alarm and surveillance system, which is monitored at all times.

The facility exceeds all the requirements of the U.S. Department of Agriculture and Association of Zoos and Aquariums (AZA), a professional accrediting agency. UNA's live lion mascot tradition began in 1973, when then-President Dr. Robert Guillot personally acquired a 12-pound lion cub, now known as Leo I, from a Knoxville, Tennessee, zoo.  Since then, his birth date, April 14, has been celebrated as the official lion mascot birthday—an annual event that attracts kindergarten and elementary school children from throughout the Shoals region.

The current lions, which are siblings, were born November 18, 2002, at a USDA-sanctioned refuge owned by Glen and Kathy Eldridge in Greenville, New Hampshire.

Notes

External links
Official website

University of North Alabama campus
Tourist attractions in Lauderdale County, Alabama
Zoos in Alabama